Simón Radowitzky (10 September or 10 November 1891 – 29 February 1956) was a militant Argentine worker and anarchist. He was one of the best-known prisoners of the penal colony in Ushuaia, Tierra del Fuego, where he was held for the assassination of Ramón Lorenzo Falcón, a head of police responsible for the brutal repression of Red Week in 1909 in Buenos Aires.

Radowitzky was pardoned after 21 years, he left Argentina and fought with the Republicans during the Spanish Civil War. He died in Mexico where he worked in a factory making toys. The story of his life is described in the travel book In Patagonia by the English author Bruce Chatwin.

Early years 
He immigrated to Argentina in March 1908; he settled in the city of Campana, Buenos Aires where he worked as a mechanical worker in the workshops of the Central Argentine Railway. There, he maintained close contacts with the growing local anarchist community, reading La Protesta, the newspaper of the Federación Obrera Regional Argentina; through the Federation he came into contact with a group of intellectual anarchists of Russian origin, including Pablo Karaschin — author of an attack on the occasion of the funeral of Carlos de Borbón — José Buwitz, Iván Mijin, Andrés Ragapeloff, Máximo Sagarín, and Moisés Scutz. After living in Campana, he moved to the city of Buenos Aires where he lived with some of these while serving as a blacksmith and mechanic.

See also 
 Anarchism in Argentina
 Illegalism
 Sante Geronimo Caserio
 Severino Di Giovanni

References

External links 
 
 Simon Radowitzky, Open Letter to the Uruguayan Communist Party and CGT, 1936

1891 births
1956 deaths
Argentine anarchists
Argentine anti-fascists
Argentine expatriates in Mexico
Argentine Jews
Argentine expatriates in Spain
Illegalists
Emigrants from the Russian Empire to Argentina
Jews from the Russian Empire
Insurrectionary anarchists
Jewish anarchists
People from Campana, Buenos Aires
Ukrainian anarchists